The 2016 Antrim Senior Hurling Championship was the 116th staging of the Antrim Senior Hurling Championship since its establishment by the Antrim County Board in 1901. The championship began on 7 August 2016 ended on 25 September 2016.

Preliminary match

Quarter-finals

Semi-finals

Final

References

External links
 Antrim GAA website

Antrim Senior Hurling Championship
Antrim Senior Hurling Championship